Events in the year 1971 in Japan. It corresponds to Shōwa 46 (昭和46年) in the Japanese calendar.

Incumbents 
 Emperor: Hirohito
 Prime minister: Eisaku Satō (Liberal Democratic)
 Chief Cabinet Secretary: Shigeru Hori until July 5, Noboru Takeshita
 Chief Justice of the Supreme Court: Kazuto Ishida
 President of the House of Representatives: Naka Funada
 President of the House of Councillors: Yūzō Shigemune until July 17, Kenzō Kōno

Governors
Aichi Prefecture: Mikine Kuwahara 
Akita Prefecture: Yūjirō Obata 
Aomori Prefecture: Shunkichi Takeuchi 
Chiba Prefecture: Taketo Tomonō 
Ehime Prefecture: Sadatake Hisamatsu (until 27 January); Haruki Shiraishi (starting 28 January)
Fukui Prefecture: Heidayū Nakagawa 
Fukuoka Prefecture: Hikaru Kamei 
Fukushima Prefecture: Morie Kimura
Gifu Prefecture: Saburō Hirano 
Gunma Prefecture: Konroku Kanda 
Hiroshima Prefecture: Iduo Nagano 
Hokkaido: Kingo Machimura (until 23 April); Naohiro Dōgakinai (starting 23 April)
Hyogo Prefecture: Tokitada Sakai
Ibaraki Prefecture: Nirō Iwakami 
Ishikawa Prefecture: Yōichi Nakanishi 
Iwate Prefecture: Tadashi Chida 
Kagawa Prefecture: Masanori Kaneko 
Kagoshima Prefecture: Saburō Kanemaru 
Kanagawa Prefecture: Bunwa Tsuda 
Kochi Prefecture: Masumi Mizobuchi 
Kumamoto Prefecture: Kōsaku Teramoto (until 10 February); Issei Sawada (starting 11 February)
Kyoto Prefecture: Torazō Ninagawa 
Mie Prefecture: Satoru Tanaka 
Miyagi Prefecture: Sōichirō Yamamoto 
Miyazaki Prefecture: Hiroshi Kuroki 
Nagano Prefecture: Gon'ichirō Nishizawa 
Nagasaki Prefecture: Kan'ichi Kubo 
Nara Prefecture: Ryozo Okuda 
Niigata Prefecture: Shiro Watari
Oita Prefecture: Kaoru Kinoshita (until 27 April); Masaru Taki (starting 28 April)
Okayama Prefecture: Takenori Kato 
Osaka Prefecture: Gisen Satō (until 22 April); Ryōichi Kuroda (starting 23 April)
Saga Prefecture: Sunao Ikeda 
Saitama Prefecture: Hiroshi Kurihara 
Shiga Prefecture: Kinichiro Nozaki 
Shiname Prefecture: Choemon Tanabe (until 29 April); Seiji Tsunematsu (starting 30 April)
Shizuoka Prefecture: Yūtarō Takeyama 
Tochigi Prefecture: Nobuo Yokokawa 
Tokushima Prefecture: Yasunobu Takeichi 
Tokyo: Ryōkichi Minobe 
Tottori Prefecture: Jirō Ishiba 
Toyama Prefecture: Kokichi Nakada 
Wakayama Prefecture: Masao Ohashi 
Yamagata Prefecture: Tōkichi Abiko 
Yamaguchi Prefecture: Masayuki Hashimoto 
Yamanashi Prefecture: Kunio Tanabe

Events 
 January 2 - A ryokan fire in Wakayama kills 16 people and injures 15.
 March Unknown date – Nagase Upbright Cram School, as predecessor of Nagase Brothers Group was founded in Mitaka, Tokyo.
 March 4 - A Lake Kawaguchi to Otsuki local train collision with truck in Fujikyu Line, Fujiyoshida, Yamanashi Prefecture, according to Japan Transport Ministry official confirmed report, 17 person were lost to lives, with 69 person were wounded. 
 April 1 – Apa Group founded, as predecessor name was Shinkin Developer in Komatsu, Ishikawa Prefecture. 
 April 27 - A massive forest fire in Kure, Hiroshima Prefecture, according to Fire and Disaster Management Agency confirmed report, 18 firefighter were lost their lives.
 July 3 - Toa Domestic Airlines Flight 63 crash into Mount Yokotsu, Hakodate, Hokkaido, according to Japan Transport Ministry official confirmed report, all 68 person were lost to lives.
 July 18 - A heavy torrential rain, wide range affective landslide, debris flow, bridge collapse around Aioi and Sayo, Hyogo Prefecture, 19 person were lost to lives, 26 persons were wounded, according to Japan Fire and Disaster Management Agency official confirmed report.
 July 20 - A first McDonald's fast food outlet open in Japan at Ginza, Tokyo.
 July 30 - An All Nippon Airways Boeing 727 collides with a Japanese fighter jet, resulting in a loss of 162 lives.
 October 25 - Collision of two limited express trains on the Kintetsu Osaka Line in Hakusan (now Tsu) in Mie Prefecture. Casualties include 25 dead and 227 wounded.
 November 11 - A slope failure field site collapsed during an experiment in Tama-ku, Kawasaki, Kanagawa Prefecture. According to a Japan Fire and Disaster Management Agency confirmed report, 15 persons lost their lives, 10 persons were wounded.

Births 

January 2 - Yutaka Takenouchi, actor
 January 4
Junichi Kakizaki, botanist and floral designer
Hiroyuki Sato, professional baseball player
Futoshi Yamabe, professional baseball player
 January 5 - Mayuko Takata, actress
January 6 - Mitsuru Manaka, professional baseball player
January 8 - Kenjiro Kawasaki, professional baseball player
January 17 - Youki Kudo, actress
January 19 – Tamayo Marukawa, politician, cabinet minister, representative and former TV announcer
January 20 - Masaru Hanada, sumo, 66th generation Yokozuna
January 23
Kaori Kawamura, singer (d. 2009)
Akira Ota, professional baseball player
January 27 - Tomoefuji Toshihide, sumo,
January 31 - Yasuo Manaka, soccer player
February 2 – Kiyoshi Toyoda, former professional baseball pitcher 
February 14
Risa Hirako, model
Noriko Sakai, pop singer and actress
February 22 – Etsuko Kozakura, voice actress 
 March 2 - Manami Toyota, professional wrestler
 March 4 - Satoshi Motoyama, professional racing driver
 March 6 - Maguro Fujita, manga artist
 March 10
Ryu Fujisaki, manga artist
Tsubuyaki Shirō, comedian
 March 13 - Tsutomu Nishino, football player
 March 15 - Risa Junna, actress and singer
 March 16 - Tae Kimura, actress
 March 17 - Masataka Gōda, professional shogi player
 March 20 - Shinichiro Ohta, voice actor and TV announcer
 March 24 - Shinichi Hatori, free announcer, tarento, and TV presenter
 March 26 - Moyoco Anno, manga artist
 March 29
Shizuka Ishikawa, voice actress
Hidetoshi Nishijima, actor
 April 2
Makoto Hasegawa, basketball player
Cunning Takeyama comedian and actor.
Zeebra, rapper
 April 5
Takami Itō, author
Ayako Nishikawa, cosmetic surgeon
 April 8 - Yoshinobu Ohga, musician
 April 12 - Takako Katō, basketball player
 April 18 - Junya Ogawa, politician
 April 22 - Daisuke Enomoto, would-be first Japanese space tourist
 April 23 - Shigetoshi Hasebe, football player and manager
 April 26 - Naoki Tanaka, comedian, actor and presenter
 May 2
 Musashimaru Kōyō, sumo wrestler
 Shu Takumi, creator of Ace Attorney
 May 3 - Ryo Kawano, baseball player
 May 9 - Hiroki Azuma, cultural critic, novelist, and philosopher
 May 11 – Tsutomu Iwamoto, former professional baseball pitcher 
 May 12
Kayoko Okubo, comedian, tarento and actress 
Nao Nagasawa, voice actress
 May 14 - Takashi Kashiwada, baseball player
 May 20 - Yasuko Mitsuura, comedian
 May 21 - Yoshikazu Mera, countertenor
 May 24 - Taizō Mikazuki, politician and governor
 May 25 - Kōtarō Isaka, author
 May 26 - Takuro, musician
 May 28 - Miho Otani, JMSDF officer
 June 5
Miyuki Komatsu, actress
Tomoko Nakajima, actress
 June 8 - Teru, musician and singer
 June 10 - Tadashi Nakamura, footballer
 June 11 - Kenjiro Tsuda, voice actor
 June 14 - Ken Maeda, comedian, impressionist, and actor
 June 18 - Yoshiyuki Shinoda, footballer and manager
 June 23 - Katsuhiro Maeda, baseball player
 June 24 - Toshihiro Noguchi, baseball player
 June 27 - Shizuka Ochi, actress
 June 28 - Norika Fujiwara, actress and television personality
 June 29 - Junko Noda, voice actress
 July 1 - Yusuke Torigoe, baseball player
 July 17 - Ritsuko Tanaka, actress and singer.
 July 19 - Naoki Soma, footballer
 July 23 - Noriko Mizoguchi, judoka
 July 24 - Tetsuji Nakamura, politician
 July 26 - Kazuki Sakuraba, author
 August 25 - Ayumi Miyazaki, singer
 September 2 – Fumie Hosokawa, actress 
 September 7 - Tomomi Okazaki, speed skater
 September 10 - Tomo Sakurai, voice actress
 September 12 – Atsuko Wakai, karateka
 October 1 - Tatsuya Ide, baseball player
 October 4 – Toshihisa Nishi, former professional baseball player 
 October 8 - Hiroki Kokubo, baseball player
 October 25 - Midori Gotō, violinist
 November 12 - Yasuo Aiuchi, snowboarder
 November 29 - Naoko Mori, actress 
 December 2 - Mine Yoshizaki, Manga artist
 December 28 - Machiko Toyoshima, voice actress
 December 30 – Daisuke Motoki, former professional baseball player

Deaths 
February 26 – Yahei Miura, athlete (b. 1895)
April 20 – Hyakken Uchida, author, writer and academic (b. 1889)
October 21 – Naoya Shiga, novelist and short story writer (b. 1883)

See also
 1971 in Japanese television
 List of Japanese films of 1971

References

 
Japan
Years of the 20th century in Japan